Choi Bool-am (born June 15, 1940) is a South Korean actor and a professor.

Biography
Choi was the only son to his father Choi Cheol, a business man, and his mother Lee Myeong-suk who was a daughter of a royal pharmacist of the Korean Empire. Choi Cheol suddenly died when Choi was 8 years old and entered Sinheung Elementary School in Incheon. Choi moved to Seoul to attend Jungang Middle School. Choi was drawn to theater as he entered a theater club at Jungang High School. Choi established directing experiences while at Seorabeol Art College (which has since merged into the present-day Chung-Ang University). He entered Hanyang University in 1960. Before graduation, Choi starred in several plays. Choi was recruited as a KBS TV actor in 1976, and entered stardom with the role of Kim Jongseo in the drama series, Prince Suyang.

Filmography
*Note; the whole list is referenced.

Film

Television series

Ambassadorship 
 Ambassador of Public Relations to Seoul (2023)

Awards
 1974, the 10th Baeksang Arts Awards : Best TV Acting (한백년(MBC))
 1975, the 11th Baeksang Arts Awards : Favorite TV Actor selected by readers
 1978, the 17th Grand Bell Awards : Best Supporting Actor (세종대왕)
 1978, the 14th Baeksang Arts Awards : Excellent TV Acting (당신(MBC))
 1979, the 18th Grand Bell Awards : Best Actor (달려라 만석아)
 1980, the 1st Korean Film Critics Association Awards : Best Actor (최후의 증인)
 2008, the 3rd Seoul International Drama Awards Star Hall of Fame
 2022, the 15th Korea Drama Awards: Achievement Award

References

External links
 
 

1940 births
Living people
South Korean male television actors
South Korean male film actors
South Korean male stage actors
Hanyang University alumni
South Korean Roman Catholics
Best Actor Paeksang Arts Award (theatre) winners